The Stealers is a 1920 American silent drama film directed by Christy Cabanne.

Plot
As described in a film magazine, Rev. Robert Martin (Tooker) is an ex-minister who has lost his faith because of his wife's faithlessness, and taken up a life of crime as head of a band of pickpockets masquerading as religious workers who ply their trade in the wake of a traveling carnival company. He tries to keep the true nature of his work secret from his daughter Julie (Shearer), but she learns the truth while traveling with his band for a week. One by one the members of the band are regenerated through a renewal of their faith. Stephen Gregory (Miller), the last of the band to find solace in faith, tries upon a wager to induce his friend Mary Forrest (Dwyer) to leave the man she married while he is under arrest and to go with him.

Cast
 William H. Tooker as Rev. Robert Martin  
 Robert Kenyon as Robert Martin (while a young man)  
 Myrtle Morse as Mrs. Martin  
 Norma Shearer as Julie Martin  
 Ruth Dwyer as Mary Forrest  
 Eugene Borden as Sam Gregory  
 Jack Crosby as Raymond Pritchard  
 Matthew Betz as Bert Robinson  
 John B. O'Brien as Man of Dawn  
 Downing Clarke as Major Wellington  
 Walter Miller as Stephen Gregory

References

Bibliography
 Jack Jacobs and Myron Braum. The Films of Norma Shearer. A. S. Barnes, 1976.

External links

1920 films
Films directed by Christy Cabanne
American silent feature films
1920s English-language films
American black-and-white films
Silent American drama films
1920 drama films
Film Booking Offices of America films
1920s American films